Eric Joseph Fryer (born August 26, 1985) is an American former professional baseball catcher. Also known by his nick name "Soulja Boy". He played in Major League Baseball (MLB) for the Pittsburgh Pirates, Minnesota Twins, and St. Louis Cardinals. A product of Ohio State University, the Milwaukee Brewers selected him in the ninth round of the 2007 Major League Baseball draft.

Amateur career
Fryer attended Reynoldsburg High School, where he excelled as a catcher and pitcher, going 8-2 on the mound with a 1.35 ERA and 93 strikeouts in 60 innings pitched, and batting a school record .544 with 7 homeruns and 50 RBI, along with 26 stolen bases his senior year, earning league and district player of the year honors. He received first-team All-State honors twice, and led the team to district titles in 2003 and 2004; falling one game short of the Division 1 state championship in 2004.

He played college baseball at Ohio State. In 2006, he played collegiate summer baseball with the Harwich Mariners of the Cape Cod Baseball League. During his junior season at Ohio State, Fryer batted .322. In his three seasons at Ohio State, Fryer held a batting average of .338 with ten home runs and 126 RBIs in 172 games, earning All Big Ten honors twice. Fryer graduated from Ohio State in his first minor league offseason with magna cum laude honors.

Professional career

Milwaukee Brewers
Fryer was drafted by the Milwaukee Brewers as a catcher and left fielder in the tenth round of the 2007 Major League Baseball Draft out of Ohio State. Fryer started his professional career with the Helena Brewers in 2007. Fryer spent the 2008 season with the West Virginia Power where he won the South Atlantic League batting title and was voted into the leagues All-Star game. He batted  .335 with 10 home runs and 70 RBI on the year. On February 4, 2009, Fryer was traded to the New York Yankees in exchange for Chase Wright.

New York Yankees
Fryer played 59 games for the Tampa Yankees, hitting .300 with 15 stolen bases before being traded, along with Casey Erickson, to the Pittsburgh Pirates for Eric Hinske on June 29, 2009.

Pittsburgh Pirates
The Pirates called up Fryer for the first time to the major leagues on June 25, 2011. Fryer got his first major league hit on July 2, 2011, off Washington Nationals pitcher John Lannan. Fryer was designated for assignment on November 18, 2011. Fryer was promoted to the Pirates on June 26, 2012, then was optioned back to the minors on July 7, 2012, before being recalled again on September 1 and was designated for assignment on October 25, 2012. He elected for free agency on October 29, 2012. In 16 games with the Pirates over 2 seasons, Fryer hit 8-30 with 5 R and 1 SB.

Minnesota Twins
On November 10, 2012, Fryer signed a minor league deal with the Minnesota Twins with an invitation to spring training. He spent the season with the Triple-A Rochester Red Wings.  His contract was selected by the Twins on September 9, after Rochester was eliminated from the International League playoffs.  He hit his first major-league home run off Tommy Milone of Oakland, a 424 foot solo shot to center in a game the Twins lost 18–3. While up with the Twins for 6 games he hit .385 (5-for-13).

He was competing for the back-up catcher role along with Chris Herrmann and Josmil Pinto in 2014. He hit 3-11 with 3 RBI in 7 games in Spring Training, however that position was eventually given to Pinto. Fryer began 2014 once again with Rochester. He was outrighted to AAA on December 23, 2014.
He was recalled from AAA Rochester on July 8, 2015 after hitting over .300 on the year and being selected for Team USA to play in the Pan American Games.

St. Louis Cardinals
The St. Louis Cardinals signed Fryer on November 12, 2015, to a minor league contract with an invitation to spring training as a non-roster player.  On March 31, 2016, the club assigned him to Triple-A Memphis. However, due to an injury to backup catcher Brayan Peña, he made the major league Opening Day roster as the backup to Yadier Molina.  Fryer's first hit and RBI came in his first plate appearance of the season on April 9 against the Atlanta Braves.   He made his first start on April 17 at Busch Stadium against the Cincinnati Reds.  He reached base in all four plate appearances, including three hits in three at bats and first walk of the season, to extend a streak of seven consecutive plate appearances reaching base to open the season.  He collected his first two doubles, including driving in Aledmys Díaz for the decisive run in a 4–3 win.

Upon Peña's reinstatement from the DL on June 28, 2016, St. Louis designated Fryer for assignment. He appeared in 24 games with the Cardinals, batting .368 (14 hits in 38 at bats) with five RBI.

Second stint with Pirates
The Pirates, playing the Cardinals at Busch Stadium on July 3, 2016, claimed Fryer off waivers, and he switched dugouts to return to his former club.  Fryer went 2-4 with a double and 3 RBI against the Cardinals  on July 5, 2016 after they placed him on waivers to make room on their roster.

Second stint with the Cardinals
On December 12, 2016, he signed a minor league contract with the Cardinals, that included an invitation to major league spring training. His contract was purchased, and he was added to the 40-man roster on March 29.
With the addition of Carson Kelly on July 21, Fryer was designated for assignment, and removed from the 40-man roster by the Cardinals. The Cardinals assigned Fryer outright to AAA Memphis on July 24 but he refused the assignment and became a free agent.

Retirement
On December 18, 2017, Fryer signed a minor league contract with the Philadelphia Phillies. However, on February 12, 2018, Fryer announced that he had decided to retire instead of reporting to camp.

See also

References

External links

1985 births
Living people
Baseball players from Columbus, Ohio
Major League Baseball catchers
Baseball players at the 2015 Pan American Games
Pittsburgh Pirates players
Minnesota Twins players
St. Louis Cardinals players
Ohio State Buckeyes baseball players
Harwich Mariners players
Helena Brewers players
West Virginia Power players
Tampa Yankees players
Lynchburg Hillcats players
Gulf Coast Pirates players
Bradenton Marauders players
Altoona Curve players
Indianapolis Indians players
Rochester Red Wings players
Pan American Games competitors for the United States